Loren Adelson Singer (March 5, 1923, – December 19, 2009) was an American novelist, known best for his 1970 political thriller The Parallax View, which was made as a successful 1974 movie, of the same name.

Early life
Singer was born in Buffalo, New York, on March 5, 1923. After he completed high school he enlisted with the United States Army. He was sent to Yale University by the Office of Strategic Services to study the Malay language, but the war ended before he could serve active duty. While with the OSS, Singer learned details of covert operations that became the theme of many of his novels.  After the war ended, in 1947, Singer earned an undergraduate degree in English from the Ohio State University and married Erma Rosenstadt.

Career 
Singer and his wife relocated to New York City during the early 1950s. There he worked for his father-in-law's printing business while he wrote for such television programs as Kraft Television Theater, Studio One and Westinghouse Playhouse.

His 1970 novel The Parallax View was adapted into the film of the same name which tells the story of a reporter who investigates a series of deaths of witnesses of the assassination of a presidential candidate, whose death had been attributed to a lone gunman. The book was published in 1970 at a time when there was still much controversy concerning a series of political assassinations during the previous decade. The book allowed him to quit his job as a printing salesman working for his father-in-law. The movie featured actors Warren Beatty, Hume Cronyn, William Daniels, and Paula Prentiss.

Other novels Singer wrote included the 1973 police procedural That's the House, There, in which the story is told as the telephone conversations of a police sergeant, while his 1974 book Boca Grande involves intrigue in Cuba concerning a Bahamas-Jamaica yacht race. His 1993 novel Making Good is the story of a conspiracy discovered by U.S. Army soldiers who discover a trove of art looted by the Germans during World War 2.

Death

A resident of Mamaroneck, New York, Singer died on December 19, 2009, aged 86. He was survived by his wife, three sons, and six grandchildren.

References

External links
 

1923 births
2009 deaths
20th-century American novelists
American male novelists
United States Army personnel of World War II
American mystery writers
American political writers
Ohio State University alumni
Writers from Buffalo, New York
People from Mamaroneck, New York
Yale University alumni
20th-century American male writers
Novelists from New York (state)
20th-century American non-fiction writers
American male non-fiction writers
People of the Office of Strategic Services